This article presents a list of the historical events and publications of Australian literature during 1986.

Events

 Elizabeth Jolley won the 1986 Miles Franklin Award for The Well

Major publications

Novels 
 Elizabeth Jolley, The Well
 Rod Jones, Julia Paradise
 John Macgregor, Propinquity
 Tim Winton, That Eye, the Sky

Children's and young adult fiction 
 Graeme Base, Animalia
 Hesba Fay Brinsmead, Someplace Beautiful
 Victor Kelleher, Taronga
Doug MacLeod, Sister Madge's Book of Nuns
 Emily Rodda, Pigs Might Fly

Poetry 
 Lily Brett, The Auschwitz poems'''
 Robert Harris, A Cloud Passes Over Philip Hodgins, Blood and Bone Rhyll McMaster, Washing the Money: Poems with photographs Jan Owen, Boy with Telescope John A. Scott, St. Clair: Three Narratives Drama 
 Michael Gow, Away Non-fiction 
 Gillian Bouras, A Foreign Wife Robert Hughes, The Fatal Shore Kylie Tennant, The Missing HeirAwards and honours
 Geoffrey Serle , for "service to scholarship and literature, particularly in the field of Australian history"
 Nicholas Hasluck , for "service to literature"
 Dorothy Hewett , for "service to literature"
 Barbara Jefferis , for "service to literature"
 Grace Perry , for "service to Australian literature, particularly as editor of Poetry Australia''"
 Russel Ward , for "service to literature, particularly in the field of Australian history"

Births 
A list, ordered by date of birth (and, if the date is either unspecified or repeated, ordered alphabetically by surname) of births in 1986 of Australian literary figures, authors of written works or literature-related individuals follows, including year of death.

 23 August — Jack Heath, writer of fiction for children and adults

Deaths 
A list, ordered by date of death (and, if the date is either unspecified or repeated, ordered alphabetically by surname) of deaths in 1986 of Australian literary figures, authors of written works or literature-related individuals follows, including year of birth.

 27 September — Olga Masters, writer, journalist, novelist and short story writer (born 1919)
 10 November — Laurence Collinson, British and Australian playwright, actor, poet, journalist, and secondary school teacher (born 1925)

See also 
 1986 in Australia
 1986 in literature
 1986 in poetry
 List of years in literature
 List of years in Australian literature

References

-fi

1986 in Australia
Australian literature by year
20th-century Australian literature
1986 in literature